Maple Street Historic District is a national historic district located at Addison in Steuben County, New York. The district contains 42 contributing buildings (39 residences and three churches), two contributing structures (public squares), 23 contributing outbuildings (carriage houses, sheds, wellhouse, outhouse, garages), and four contributing objects (stone hitching posts).  The district encompasses Addison's most prestigious residential enclave whose buildings face inward toward Curtis Square, Maple Street, and Wombough Square. It includes Church of the Redeemer, also listed on the National Register.

It was listed on the National Register of Historic Places in 1996.

References

Historic districts on the National Register of Historic Places in New York (state)
Gothic Revival architecture in New York (state)
Historic districts in Steuben County, New York
National Register of Historic Places in Steuben County, New York